Setlist: The Very Best of New Riders of the Purple Sage Live is an album by the country rock band the New Riders of the Purple Sage.  It contains six songs selected from their live album Home, Home on the Road, recorded in 1973 and released in 1974, and six songs recorded live at various venues in 1971.  It was released by Legacy Recordings on July 12, 2011.

Critical reception

On Allmusic, Al Campbell said, "New Riders of the Purple Sage collectors will be pleased with the unreleased material, but the casual listener should first check out the band's self-titled debut album on Columbia."

Track listing
From Home, Home on the Road:
"Henry" (John Dawson) – 4:37
"Hello Mary Lou" (Gene Pitney, Cayet Mangiaracina) – 2:55
"Dead Flowers" (Mick Jagger, Keith Richards) – 3:59
"Truck Drivin' Man" (Terry Fell) – 2:58
"Kick in the Head" (Robert Hunter) – 3:10
"School Days" (Chuck Berry) – 3:06
Additional tracks:
"Portland Woman" (Dawson) – 5:11 – February 27, 1971, Fillmore West, San Francisco, California
"Glendale Train" (Dawson) – 5:05 – February 27, 1971, Fillmore West, San Francisco, California
"I Don't Know You" (Dawson) – 3:56 – April 29, 1971, Fillmore East, New York, New York
"Louisiana Lady" (Dawson) – 3:35 – August 15, 1971, Berkeley Community Theatre, Berkeley, California
"All I Ever Wanted" (Dawson) – 7:10 – April 26, 1971, Fillmore East, New York, New York
"Dirty Business" (Dawson) – 10:03 – February 28, 1971, Fillmore West, San Francisco, California

Personnel

New Riders of the Purple Sage
John Dawson – electric guitar, acoustic guitar, vocals
David Nelson – electric guitar, vocals
Dave Torbert – bass guitar, vocals
Buddy Cage – pedal steel guitar on "Henry", "Hello Mary Lou", "Dead Flowers", "Truck Drivin' Man", "Kick in the Head", "School Days"
Jerry Garcia – pedal steel guitar on "Portland Woman", "Glendale Train", "I Don't Know You", "Louisiana Lady", "All I Ever Wanted", "Dirty Business"
Spencer Dryden – drums

Additional musicians
Andy Stein – saxophone on "School Days"
David LaFlamme – violin on "Dirty Business"

Production
Compilation produced by Jeff Magid
Mastering: Dave Donnelly
Art direction and design: Rob Carter
Photography: Michael Ochs, Urve Kuusik
Liner notes: Jeff Kaliss

References

New Riders of the Purple Sage compilation albums
2011 compilation albums
Legacy Recordings compilation albums